Below is a list of Hungarian geographical names in the Vojvodina region of Serbia (Hungarian names are in parentheses).

A 

 Ada (Ada)
 Adorjan (Adorján)
 Aleksa Šantić (Sári, Babapuszta, Hadikkisfalu)
 Alibunar (Alibunár)
 Apatin (Apatin)
 Aradac (Alsóaradi, Felsőaradi)

B 

 Bač (Bács)
 Bačka Palanka (Palánka)
 Bačka Topola (Topolya)
 Bački Breg (Béreg)
 Bački Brestovac (Szilberek)
 Bački Gračac (Szentfülöp)
 Bački Monoštor (Monostorszeg)
 Bački Petrovac (Petrőc)
 Bački Sokolac (Bácsandrásszállás)
 Bački Vinogradi (Királyhalma)
 Bačko Dobro Polje (Kiskér)
 Bačko Dušanovo (Zentaörs)
 Bačko Gradište (Bácsföldvár)
 Bačko Novo Selo (Bácsújlak)
 Bačko Petrovo Selo (Péterréve)
 Bagremovo (Bárdossyfalva)
 Bajmok (Bajmok)
 Bajša (Bajsa)
 Banatska Dubica (Kismargita)
 Banatska Palanka (Palánk, Temespalánka)
 Banatska Subotica (Krassószombat)
 Banatska Topola (Töröktopolya)
 Banatski Brestovac (Bersztóc)
 Banatski Despotovac (Ernőháza)
 Banatski Dvor (Törzsudvarnok, Szőllősudvarnok)
 Banatski Karlovac (Nagykárolyfalva)
 Banatski Monoštor (Kanizsamonostor)
 Banatski Sokolac (Biószeg)
 Banatsko Aranđelovo (Oroszlámos)
 Banatsko Karađorđevo (Pálmajor)
 Banatsko Novo Selo (Révújfalu)
 Banatsko Veliko Selo (Szenthubert, Szentborbála, Károlyliget)
 Banatsko Višnjićevo (Vida)
 Baranda (Baranda)
 Barice (Szentjános)
 Bašaid (Basahíd)
 Bavanište (Bálványos, Homokbálványos)
 Bečej (Óbecse)
 Begeč (Begecs)
 Begejci (Nagytárnok, Kistárnok)
 Bela Crkva (Fehértemplom)
 Belo Blato (Nagyerzsébetlak)
 Beočin (Belcsény)
 Bezdan (Bezdán)
 Bikovo (Békova)
 Bočar (Bocsár)
 Bođani (Bogyán)
 Bogaraš (Bogaras, Félváros)
 Bogaroš (Bogaras)
 Bogojevo (Gombos)
 Boka (Bóka)
 Botoš (Bótos)
 Budisava (Tiszakálmánfalva)
 Bukovac (Bakolc)
 Busenje (Káptalanfalva)

C 

 Crepaja (Cserépalja)
 Crna Bara (Feketetó)
 Crvena Crkva (Vöröstemplom)
 Crvenka (Cservenka)

Č 

 Čantavir (Csantavér)
 Čelarevo (Dunacséb)
 Čenej (Csenej)
 Čenta (Csenta)
 Češko Selo (Csehfalva)
 Čestereg (Csősztelek)
 Čoka (Csóka)
 Čonoplja (Csonoplya)
 Čurug (Csurog)

D 

 Debeljača (Torontálvásárhely)
 Deliblato (Deliblát)
 Deronje (Dernye)
 Despotovo (Úrszentiván)
 Dobrica (Kevedobra)
 Dobričevo (Udvarszállás)
 Dobrodol (Dobradó, Dobrodol, Dobrodolpuszta)
 Doline (Völgyes)
 Dolovo (Dolova)
 Doroslovo (Doroszló)
 Drljan (Drea)
 Dubovac (Dunadombó)
 Dupljaja (Temesváralja)
 Dužine (Szécsénfalva)

Đ 

 Đala (Gyála)
 Đurđevo (Sajkásgyörgye)
 Đurđin (Györgyén)

E 

 Ečka (Écska)
 Elemir (Alsóelemér, Felsőelemér)

F 

 Farkaždin (Farkasd)
 Feketić (Bácsfeketehegy)
 Filić (Firigyháza)
 Futog (Futak)

G 

 Gaj (Gálya)
 Gajdobra (Szépliget)
 Gakovo (Gádor)
 Gardinovci (Dunagárdony)
 Glogonj (Galagonyás)
 Gložan (Dunagálos)
 Gornja Rogatica (Angyalbandi)
 Gornji Breg (Felsőhegy)
 Gospođinci (Boldogasszonyfalva)
 Grebenac (Gerebenc)
 Gudurica (Temeskutas)
 Gunaroš (Gunaras)

H 

 Hajdučica (Istvánvölgy)
 Hajdukovo (Hajdújárás)
 Hetin (Tamásfalva)
 Horgoš (Horgos)
 Hetesi (Hetesi)

I 

 Iđoš (Tiszahegyes)
 Idvor (Torontáludvar)
 Ilandža (Iloncz)
 Inđija (Ingyia)
 Irig (Ürög)
 Ivanovo (Sándoregyháza)
 Izbište (Izbiste)

J 

 Jablanka (Almád)
 Jabuka (Torontálalmás)
 Jankov Most (Jankahíd)
 Janošik (Újsándorfalva)
 Jarak (Tiszaistvánfalva)
 Jarkovac (Árkod)
 Jaša Tomić (Módos)
 Jasenovo (Karasjeszenő)
 Jazovo (Hódegyháza)
 Jermenovci (Ürményháza)

K 

 Kać (Káty)
 Kačarevo (Ferenchalom)
 Kajtasovo (Gajtas)
 Kaluđerovo (Szőllőhegy)
 Kanjiža (Magyarkanizsa)
 Karađorđevo (Bácsandrásfalva)
 Karađorđevo (Bélamajor)
 Karavukovo (Bácsordas)
 Kavilo (Kavilló, Rákóczitelkep)
 Kelebija (Kelebia)
 Kevi (Kevi)
 Kikinda (Nagykikinda)
 Kisač (Kiszács)
 Klek (Bégafő)
 Kljajićevo (Kerény)
 Knićanin (Rezsőháza)
 Kolut (Küllőd)
 Konak (Kanak)
 Kovačica (Antalfalva)
 Kovilj (Kabol)
 Kovin (Kevevára)
 Krajišnik (Istvánfölde)
 Krivaja (Bácsér)
 Kruščić (Veprőd)
 Kruščica (Körtéd)
 Kucura (Kucora)
 Kula (Kula)
 Kulpin (Kölpény)
 Kumane (Kumán)
 Kupinik (Balát)
 Kupusina (Bácskertes)
 Kusić (Kussics)
 Kuštilj (Mélykastély)

L 

 Lalić (Liliomos)
 Laudonovac (Laudontanya)
 Lazarevo (Lázárföld)
 Ledinci (Ledince)
 Lipar (Lipár)
 Lok (Sajkáslak)
 Lokve (Végszentmihály)
 Lovćenac (Szeghegy, Szikics)
 Lukićevo (Zsigmondfalva)
 Lukino Selo (Lukácsfalva)

LJ 

 Ljutovo (Mérges)

M 

 Maglić (Bulkeszi)
 Majdan (Magyarmajdány)
 Mala Bosna (Kisbosznia)
 Male Pijace (Kispiac)
 Mali Beograd (Bácsandrásföldje)
 Mali Iđoš (Kishegyes)
 Mali Pesak (Kishomok)
 Mali Siget (Sziget)
 Mali Žam (Kiszsám)
 Malo Bavanište (Kisbálványos)
 Malo Središte (Kisszered)
 Margita (Nagymargita)
 Markovac (Márktelke)
 Markovićevo (Torontálújfalu)
 Martonoš (Martonos)
 Međa (Párdány)
 Melenci (Melence)
 Mesić (Meszesfalva)
 Mićunovo (Adjisten, Karkatúr)
 Mihajlovo (Magyarszentmihály)
 Mileševo (Istenföldje)
 Miletićevo (Rárós)
 Mišićevo (Hadikörs)
 Mladenovo (Dunabökény)
 Mokrin (Mokrin, Homokrév)
 Mol (Mohol)
 Moravica (Bácskossuthfalva)
 Mošorin (Mozsor)
 Mramorak (Homokos)
 Mužlja (Muzslya)

N 

 Nadalj (Nádalja)
 Nakovo (Nákófalva)
 Neštin (Nyest)
 Neuzina (Nagynezsény, Kisnezsény)
 Nikolinci (Temesmiklós)
 Nova Crnja (Magyarcsernye)
 Nova Crvenka (Újcservenka)
 Nova Gajdobra (Wekerlefalva)
 Novi Bečej (Törökbecse)
 Novi Itebej (Magyarittabé)
 Novi Kneževac (Törökkanizsa)
 Novi Kozarci (Nagytószeg, Kistószeg)
 Novi Kozjak (Ferdinándfalva)
 Novi Sad (Újvidék)
 Novo Miloševo (Beodra, Karlova)
 Novo Orahovo (Zentagunaras)
 Novo Selo (Újfalu)

NJ 

 Njegoševo (Istenáldás)

O 

 Obornjača (Völgypart)
 Obrovac (Boróc)
 Odžaci (Hódság)
 Omoljica (Omlód)
 Opovo (Ópáva)
 Orešac (Homokdiód)
 Orešković (Bácsandrásmező)
 Orlovat (Orlód)
 Orom (Orom)
 Ostojićevo (Tiszaszentmiklós)

P 

 Pačir (Pacsér)
 Padej (Padé)
 Padina (Nagylajosfalva)
 Palić (Palics)
 Pančevo (Pancsova)
 Panonija (Pannonia)
 Parage (Parrag)
 Parta (Párta)
 Pavliš (Temespaulis)
 Pećinci (Pecsince)
 Perlez (Perlasz)
 Petrovaradin (Pétervárad)
 Pivnice (Pincéd)
 Plandište (Zichyfalva)
 Plavna (Palona)
 Pločica (Kevepallós)
 Pobeda (Győzelem)
 Podlokanj (Podlokánypuszta)
 Potporanj (Porány)
 Prigrevica (Bácsszentiván)
 Putnikovo (Torontálputnok)

R 

 Rabe (Rábé)
 Radičević (Csikériapuszta)
 Radojevo (Klári)
 Rastina (Körtéd)
 Ratkovo (Paripás)
 Ravni Topolovac (Katalinfalva)
 Ravno Selo (Ósóvé, Újsóvé)
 Riđica (Regőce)
 Ritiševo (Réthely)
 Ruma (Ruma)
 Rumenka (Piros)
 Ruski Krstur (Bácskeresztúr)
 Rusko Selo (Torontáloroszi)

S 

 Sajan (Szaján)
 Sakule (Torontálsziget)
 Samoš (Számos)
 Sanad (Szanád)
 Savino Selo (Torzsa)
 Sečanj (Torontálszécsány)
 Sefkerin (Szekerény)
 Selenča (Bácsújfalu)
 Seleuš (Keviszőllős)
 Senćanski Trešnjevac (Oromhegyes)
 Senta (Zenta)
 Silbaš (Szilbács)
 Sirig (Szőreg, Hadikvára)
 Sivac (Ószivác, Újszivác)
 Skorenovac (Székelykeve)
 Sočica (Temessszőllős)
 Sombor (Zombor)
 Sonta (Szond)
 Srbobran (Szenttamás)
 Srednji Salaš (Istenhozott)
 Sremska Kamenica (Kamanc)
 Sremska Mitrovica (Szávaszentdemeter)
 Sremski Karlovci (Karlóca)
 Srpska Crnja (Csernye, Németcsernye)
 Srpski Krstur (Ókersztúr)
 Srpski Itebej (Szerbittabé)
 Srpski Miletić (Ráczmilletics)
 Stajićevo (Óécska)
 Stanišić (Őrszállás)
 Stapar (Sztapár)
 Stara Moravica (Bácskossuthfalva)
 Stara Pazova (Ópázova)
 Starčevo (Tárcsó)
 Stari Lec (Óléc)
 Stepanovićevo (Máriamajor)
 Sterijino (Valkaisor)
 Straža (Temesőr)
 Subotica (Szabadka)
Neighborhoods of Subotica:
Novo Naselje
Srpski Šor
Kertvaroš
Mali Bajmok
Gat
 Sutjeska (Szárcsa)
 Svetićevo (Istenkeze)
 Svetozar Miletić (Nemesmillitics)
 Svilojevo (Szilágyi)

Š 

 Šajkaš (Sajkászentiván)
 Šatrinci (Satrinca)
 Šid (Sid)
 Šumarak (Emánueltelep)
 Šupljak (Ludas)
 Šurjan (Surján)
 Šušara (Fejértelep)

T 

 Taraš (Tiszatarrós)
 Tavankut (Tavankút)
 Telečka (Bácsgyulafalva)
 Temerin (Temerin)
 Titel (Titel)
 Toba (Tóba)
 Tomaševac (Tamáslaka)
 Torda (Torontáltorda)
 Tornjoš (Tornyos)
 Totovo Selo (Tóthfalu)
 Tovariševo (Bácstóváros)
 Trešnjevac (Oromhegyes)
 Turija (Turja)

U 

 Uljma (Homokszil)
 Utrine (Törökfalu)
 Uzdin (Újozora)

V 

Vajska (Vajszka)
Vatin (Versecvát)
Velebit (Fogadjisten)
Velika Greda (Györgyháza)
Velike Livade (Bozitópuszta)
Veliki Gaj (Nagygáj)
Veliko Središte (Nagyszered)
Veternik (Hadikliget)
Vilovo (Tündéres)
Višnjevac (Meggyes)
Vizić (Füzegy)
Vladimirovac (Petre)
Vlajkovac (Temesvajkóc)
Vojlovica (Hertelendyfalva)
Vojvoda Stepa (Endremajor)
Vojvoda (Völgyes)
Vojvodinci (Vajdalak)
Vračev Gaj (Varázsliget)
Vrbas (Verbász)
Vrbica (Egyházaskér)
Vršac (Versec/Érdsomlyó)
Vršački Ritovi (Verseci Rétek)

Z 

 Zagajica (Fürjes)
 Zimonić (Ilonafalu)
 Zobnatica (Andrásnépe)
 Zrenjanin (Nagybecskerek)
 Zmajevo (Ókér)

Ž 

 Žabalj (Zsablya)
 Žednik (Nagyfény)
 Žitište (Bégaszentgyörgy)

See also 
Hungarian exonyms
List of European exonyms
List of cities, towns and villages in Vojvodina

Vojvodina
Hungarian
Hungarians in Vojvodina
Hungarian exonyms in Vojvodina